Ugada is a genus of cicadas from Africa.

List of species

 Ugada grandicollis (Germar, 1830)
 Ugada inquinata (Distant, 1881)
 Ugada limbalis (Karsch, 1890)
 Ugada limbata (Fabricius, 1775)
 Ugada limbimacula (Karsch, 1893)
 Ugada nutti Distant, 1904
 Ugada praecellens (Stål, 1863)
 Ugada stalina (Butler, 1874)
 Ugada tigrina (Palisot de Beauvois, 1805)

References

Platypleurini
Hemiptera of Africa
Cicadidae genera
Taxa named by William Lucas Distant